George Whaley (19 June 1934 – 6 August 2019) was an Australian actor, director and writer, known for his work across theatre and film. He was born in Castlemaine, Victoria, Australia. He wrote and directed the mini-series The Harp in the South and it; sequel Poor Man's Orange, as well as Dad and Dave: On Our Selection.

He directed the film Dancing, produced by David Elfick,  which was shown at the Melbourne International Film Festival in 1980.

George Whaley was National Institute of Dramatic Art’s Head of Acting from 1976 to 1981, taking over from Alexander Hay. Apart from his directing work he acted in films such as Stork (1971), Alvin Purple (1973), Bliss (1985), The Crossing (1990), Turtle Beach (1992) and Daydream Believer (1992), and numerous serials including Homicide, Division 4, The Flying Doctors, A Country Practice and All Saints.

References

External sources

1934 births
2019 deaths
Australian directors
Australian male actors

Australian theatre directors